Suma may refer to:

Places 
 Suma, Azerbaijan, a village
 Suma, East Azerbaijan, a village in Iran
 Sowmaeh, Ardabil, also known as Şūmā, a village in Iran
 Suma-ku, Kobe, one of nine wards of Kobe City in Japan
 Suma Station, a railway station in the ward
 Suma Municipality, Yucatán, Mexico
 Suma (ward), an administrative ward in Rungwe District, Mbeya Region, Tanzania
 Suma River, Mbeya Region, Tanzania

People

Ethnic groups 
 Suma people, an indigenous people of Mexico and the United States
 The Suma, a subgroup of the African Gbaya people

Given name  
 Suma Kanakala (born 1975), Indian television presenter
 Suma Shirur (born 1974), Indian sport shooter

Nickname 
 Suma Chakrabarti (born 1959), British civil servant
 Peter Sumich (born 1968), Australian rules footballer

Surname 
 Andrea Suma (13??–14??), Albanian prelate of the Roman Catholic Church
 Jak Mark Suma, Albanian diplomat
 Kanita Suma (born 2001), Albanian singer
 Kei Suma (1935–2013), Japanese actor
 Lamin Suma (born 1991), Sierra Leonean football right-winger
 Marina Suma (born 1959), Italian actress
 Mikel Suma (1695–1777), Albanian Catholic Archbishop of Skopje from 1728 to 1743
 Nova Ren Suma (born 1975), American novelist
 Sheriff Suma (born 1986), Sierra Leonean footballer

Other people 
 Ching Hai (born 1950), Vietnamese spiritual leader commonly called Suma

Naval vessels 
 Suma-class cruiser, a class of two Imperial Japanese Navy protected cruisers
 Japanese cruiser Suma, lead ship of the class, launched in 1895
 Japanese gunboat Suma, scuttled as HMS Moth in 1941, refloated and renamed for Second World War service
 HMT Suma, a Second World War Royal Navy trawler - see List of requisitioned trawlers of the Royal Navy (WWII)

Other uses
 Suma (co-operative), a workers' co-operative of the United Kingdom
 Suma Gestión Tributaria, a Spanish administration body
 Suma (moth), a genus of moths in the family Erebidae
 Suma root, from a South American vine
 Service Update Management Assistant, part of the IBM AIX operating system
 Suma, a language closely related to the Gbeya language

See also 

 
 
 Summa (disambiguation)
 Sima (disambiguation), a Chinese surname sometimes rendered as "Suma"
 Sumas (disambiguation)

Lists of people by nickname